Lewis Ryan Neal (born 14 July 1981) is a former English professional footballer who is currently an assistant coach for National Premier Soccer League club Central Florida Panthers SC.

Career
Neal started his career at Stoke City, making his debut in the Football League Trophy on 6 December 2000 against Scarborough. He went on loan to Icelandic side Íþróttabandalag Vestmannaeyja before returning to Stoke. He played 70 league games and scored 2 goals for Stoke before signing for Preston North End in 2005 in a player swap deal for Marlon Broomes.

On 31 October 2008, Neal signed a month-long loan deal with Notts County, and made his debut at home to Bury.

After playing 65 league games for Preston, Neal was allowed to join Carlisle United on 30 January 2009, after agreeing to a termination package. He signed a contract to the end of the season. He made his Carlisle debut in the 1–1 home draw against Walsall, but at the end of the season manager Greg Abbott decided to release him.

A day after his contract expired with Carlisle on 2 July 2009, Neal signed a two-year contract with League Two club Shrewsbury Town.

On 22 January 2011, he was released by Shrewsbury Town, by mutual consent. He moved to the United States and entered training camp with Orlando City Soccer Club of the USL Pro league, the third tier of US Soccer. He scored the team's first ever goal on 19 February in a friendly against Philadelphia Union. Lewis signed with Orlando on 21 March 2011.

In early 2012, Neal was on trial with Real Salt Lake of Major League Soccer but was not offered a contract. He signed into the league with D.C. United on 13 March 2012. During his time with D.C., he scored the lone goal in the 2013 U.S. Open Cup final against Real Salt Lake, giving D.C. their third Open Cup title.

After three years with D.C., Neal returned to Florida when he was selected by new franchise Orlando City SC in the 2014 MLS Expansion Draft. He was released by Orlando at the end of the 2015 season. On 17 December, Orlando City confirmed that Neal had been resigned on a two-year deal giving him an extended role with the organization including an academy coaching role, a playing position on the Orlando City B team and media duties.

Neal continued his professional career by signing with the Orlando SeaWolves in May 2018, ahead of their inaugural Major Arena Soccer League season.

In March 2021, Neal rejoined former SeaWolves coach Tom Traxler by joining the coaching staff of Central Florida Panthers SC of the National Premier Soccer League

Personal life
Neal earned his US green card in February 2013. This status qualifies him as a domestic player for MLS roster purposes.

Career statistics

A.  The "Other" column constitutes appearances and goals in the Football League play-offs, Football League Trophy and CONCACAF Champions League.

Honours
 Orlando City
USL Pro: 2011

D.C. United
 Lamar Hunt U.S. Open Cup: 2013

References

External links

1981 births
Living people
Footballers from Leicester
English footballers
English expatriate footballers
Stoke City F.C. players
Lewis Neal
Preston North End F.C. players
Notts County F.C. players
Carlisle United F.C. players
Shrewsbury Town F.C. players
Orlando City SC (2010–2014) players
D.C. United players
Orlando City SC players
English expatriate sportspeople in Iceland
English Football League players
USL Championship players
Major League Soccer players
Expatriate footballers in Iceland
Expatriate soccer players in the United States
English expatriate sportspeople in the United States
Orlando City B players
Association football midfielders
Orlando SeaWolves players
Major Arena Soccer League players
National Premier Soccer League coaches